Gustav Deutsch (19 May 1952 – 2 November 2019) was an Austrian multidisciplinary artist, art director, and film director.

Biography
Deutsch studied architecture at the Vienna University of Technology and carried out several multidisciplinary art projects.

Filmography
Taschenkino (1995)
Film ist mehr als Film (1996)
Film ist. 7-12 (2002)
Welt Spiegel Kino (2005)
Film Is... (2009)
60 Seconds of Solitude in Year Zero (2011)
Shirley: Visions of Reality (2013)

References

Artists from Vienna
University of Vienna alumni
1952 births
2019 deaths
Austrian film directors
Burials at Ottakring Cemetery